The Tetramelaceae are a family of plants formerly classed in the Datiscaceae family . It contains two genera, Octomeles and Tetrameles, each with a single species.

References

 
Rosid families